Dresden (also Dresdon) is an unincorporated community in Pettis County, Missouri, United States.

History
A post office called Dresden was established in 1863, and remained in operation until 1954. The community was named after Dresden, Germany. Dresden was once an incorporated town.

References

Unincorporated communities in Pettis County, Missouri
Unincorporated communities in Missouri